Raphaël Comte (born 28 September 1979) is a Swiss lawyer and politician. He has served as a member of the Council of States from 1 March 2010 to 1 December 2019, and was its president from 2015 to 2016. 

A member of the Swiss delegation to the Parliamentary Assembly of the Council of Europe since 2012, Comte serves as member of the Committee on Legal Affairs and Human Rights and the Committee on Culture, Science, Education and Media. In addition, he is currently the Assembly's rapporteur on human rights in Ukraine as well as on the protection and preservation of Jewish heritage sites.

References

Living people
1979 births
People from Neuchâtel
21st-century Swiss lawyers
Members of the Council of States (Switzerland)
Presidents of the Council of States (Switzerland)
FDP.The Liberals politicians